A wildflower strip is a section of land set aside to grow wildflowers.  These may be at the edge of a crop field to mitigate agricultural intensification and monoculture; along road medians and verges; or in parkland or other open spaces such as the Coronation Meadows.  Such strips are an attractive amenity and may also improve biodiversity, conserving birds, insects and other wildlife.

General characteristics

Wildflower strips, a semi-natural man-made habitat comprising mixtures of native herbaceous species, can be sown on arable field margins to provide multiple ecological, agricultural and conservation benefits. They typically measure 3 – 10 m across  and vary in their plant species composition depending on the purpose for which they are established.

The purposes for which wildflower strips are sown can vary. These may be to provide nectar sources for certain pollinator species, promote biological pest control, or enhance local biodiversity by improving habitat quality and diversity.

Early concepts of wildflower strips were first developed in Switzerland in the 1980s, whereupon these ideas became merged under the German name "Buntbrachen" (wildflower strips) and established within Swiss agricultural policy.

Wildflower strips can be naturally regenerated on a range of soil types. However, on nutrient-rich soils, the result is likely to be a plant community with low species richness and dominated by vigorous grasses; so that lighter soils may be preferable to give all species present a reasonable chance.

In contrast to the traditional wildflower strips that border field margins, infield wildflower strips have more recently been trialed. In this approach, wildflower strips are extended beyond field boundaries to traverse the centre of fields. Thereby, they may be regarded as an extension to in-field beetle banks and are primarily targeted at making a larger proportion of arable crop easily accessible to natural enemies of crop pests.

Ecological benefits and conservation value

As well as adding colour and aesthetic appeal to the otherwise homogeneous agricultural landscape, wildflower strips provide food, shelter and overwintering sites for arthropod species that benefit agriculture and ecosystem functionality. The beneficiaries may play an important role in controlling insect pests of commercial crops; or in pollinating crops, as with bumblebees and honeybees that are attracted to the wildflowers for a nectar source. In the former case, the pest-controlling arthropods profit from the high insulation capacity of the vegetation that makes the wildflower strips suitable as overwintering sites during winter. Thus, wildflower strips can significantly enhance local biodiversity and mitigate declines in economically important invertebrate populations through intensive agriculture. As such, they may be regarded as ecological compensation areas interspersed in a highly disturbed, wildlife-impoverished agroecosystem.

Wildflower strips can also improve habitat connectivity within the agricultural landscape by functioning as wildlife corridors for beneficiary taxa in question.

Economic benefits

Wildflower strips can be highly beneficial to agriculture by attracting pollinating insects and pest-controlling arthropods, thereby potentially improving crop yields. Sowing strips of wildflowers along a given area is usually worthwhile if the resulting increase in natural pollination improves crops yields beyond those obtained in the absence of wildflower strips. Moreover, from a farmer’s perspective, investing in relatively inexpensive seed mixtures to create wildflower strips and thereby promote natural pollination is an effective way of reducing reliance on commercially sourced pollinators and ensuring against potential market supply failures for pollinators such as bumblebees.

By restoring the previously lost semi-natural habitat for pollinators through establishment of wildflower strips along field margins, the loss in pollination services resulting from declines in pollinating insects may be sufficiently recouped.

Effectiveness

Although generally beneficial to wildlife, the success of a wildflower strip, both from an ecological and agricultural perspective, depends on several important factors such as the right plant species composition and the local landscape context in which the strip is created. Ultimately however, the right choice of plant species to be sown in the right place is contingent upon the specific conservation aims of the wildflower strip. For example, in an intensive agricultural landscape where the main beneficiaries are intended to be the locally common pollinating bee species, wildflower strips sown from a mixture of seeds from various plant species with differential suitability for various pollinators may be best. On the other hand, wildflower strips can also be planted in a more targeted approach to help save endangered pollinating insect species of interest, in which case seed mixtures should primarily contain the preferred host plants of the species in question

The connectivity of several wildflower strips with each other and wider landscape features is important for ensuring a viable network of natural and semi-natural habitats within the landscape to benefit movement of wildlife. However, it can take several years of vegetation growth and development before the ecological benefits are significantly realised.

As well as getting the species composition and landscape context right, wildflower strips should also be designed to ensure seasonal continuity of floral resources for as long as possible in any given year. This can be achieved by sowing a mixture of annuals, biennials, and perennials at sufficiently high densities and with differing flowering times. By sowing side by side species with different individual flowering periods, the resulting wildflower strip will be available for use by a range of arthropods for a greater portion of the year. This design also benefits insects with long colony cycles such as bumblebees.

Examples of ideal dominant plants within wildflower strips include species in the Fabaceae, which are especially favoured by pollinating bees, or Apiaceae (carrot family), which are good for attracting pest-controlling arthropods. However, care should be taken not to choose dominant species that are highly prone to slug herbivory, such as Centaurea cyanus or Papaver rhoeas, since this may compromise the growth and development of the strip.

Another consideration is the economic practicality of planting and maintaining these strips at the farmer’s end. In addition to the investment in the initial seed mixture for sowing, farmers will also need to account for the cost of maintaining the wildflower strip in subsequent years to prevent invasion of vigorous grass species or other perennial weeds.

Sometimes, the selective sowing of food plants favoured by the larva of target species in wildflower strips is conducive to fulfilling conservation goals, although this has not been usually considered in designing agri-environment schemes.

References

Meadows